Larry Edwards (born November 4, 1984) is an American football linebacker for the Columbus Lions of the National Arena League (NAL). He was signed by the Bills as an undrafted free agent in 2007. He played college football at North Carolina.

Professional career

Buffalo Bills
Edwards was signed as an undrafted free agent by the Buffalo Bills following the 2007 NFL Draft.

Albany Panthers
Edwards has played with the Albany Panthers since their expansion season in 2010. Edwards was a First-team All-PIFL selection in 2012. Edwards has re-signed with the Panthers for the 2014 season.

Georgia Fire
Edwards played for the Georgia Fire in 2014, a team that was created by the PIFL to replace the Panthers who folded prior to the start of the season.

Columbus Lions
Edwards joined the Columbus Lions for the 2015 season, and the Lions obtained the best record in the PIFL, earning a berth in PIFL Cup IV. Edwards was named Second-team All-PIFL. The Lions won the PIFL Championship 64–38 over the Richmond Raiders.

Georgia Firebirds
On December 8, 2016, Edwards signed with the Georgia Firebirds.

Columbus Lions
On April 25, 2017, Edwards was traded to the Columbus Lions.

References

1984 births
Living people
American football linebackers
North Carolina Tar Heels football players
Buffalo Bills players
Florida Firecats players
Jacksonville Sharks players
Players of American football from Tampa, Florida
Albany Panthers players
Georgia Fire players
Columbus Lions players
Georgia Firebirds players